Adiantum, the maidenhair fern, is a genus of about 250 species of ferns in the subfamily Vittarioideae of the family Pteridaceae, though some researchers place it in its own family, Adiantaceae. The genus name comes from Greek, meaning "unwetted", referring to the fronds' ability to shed water without becoming wet.

Description
They are distinctive in appearance, with dark, often black stipes and rachises, and bright green, often delicately cut leaf tissue. The sori are borne submarginally, and are covered by reflexed flaps of leaf tissue which resemble indusia. Dimorphism between sterile and fertile fronds is generally subtle.

They generally prefer humus-rich, moist, well-drained sites, ranging from bottomland soils to vertical rock walls. Many species are especially known for growing on rock walls around waterfalls and water seepage areas.

The highest species diversity is in the Andes. Fairly high diversity also occurs in eastern Asia, with nearly 40 species in China.

Species native to North America include A. pedatum (five-fingered fern) and the closely related A. aleuticum, which are distinctive in having a bifurcating frond that radiates pinnae on one side only. The cosmopolitan A. capillus-veneris (Venus-hair fern) has a native distribution that extends into the eastern continent. A. jordanii (California Maidenhair) is native to the west coast.

There is a rich Adiantum flora in New Zealand with 3 endemic species (A. cunninghamii, A. viridescens and A. fulvum) in a total of 10 recorded species. Many of these are common especially in the west and south of the islands.

Cladistics
It is now known that this genus is paraphyletic, and that the vittarioid ferns are derived from this larger paraphyletic genus. However, if Adiantum raddianum, and possibly a few other species, are removed, the remaining plants (genus type: Adiantum capillus-veneris) are then monophyletic.

Cultivation
Many species are grown in the horticultural trade. There are a number of tropical species, including A. raddianum and A. peruvianum. Both A. pedatum and A. aleuticum are hardy to zone 3, and are by far the most cold-hardy members of the genus. A. venustum is also cold-hardy to zone 5. A. capillus-veneris is hardy to zone 7. Hybrids, such as Adiantum × mairisii, are also popular.

List of species

Adiantum abscissum
Adiantum aculeolatum—synonym of Adiantum mindanaense
Adiantum adiantoides
Adiantum aethiopicum – common maidenhair, true maidenhair
Adiantum alarconianum
Adiantum aleuticum – Aleutian maidenhair, western five-fingered Fern
Adiantum amazonicum
Adiantum amblyopteridium
Adiantum amelianum
Adiantum anceps – double edge maidenhair
Adiantum aneitense
Adiantum angustatum
Adiantum annamense
Adiantum atroviride
Adiantum bellum – Bermuda maidenhair
Adiantum bessoniae
Adiantum blumenavense
Adiantum boliviense
Adiantum bonatianum
Adiantum bonii
Adiantum brasiliense – Brazilian maidenhair
Adiantum breviserratum
Adiantum calcareum
Adiantum capillus-junonis
Adiantum capillus-veneris – black maidenhair, southern maidenhair, Venus' hair
Adiantum caudatum – walking maidenhair, tailed maidenhair, trailing maidenhair
Adiantum celebicum
Adiantum chilense
Adiantum christii
Adiantum comoroense
Adiantum concinnum – polished maidenhair, brittle maidenhair
Adiantum coreanum – Korean maidenhair fern
Adiantum crespianum
Adiantum cultratum
Adiantum cuneatiforme
Adiantum cuneatum (junior synonym of A. raddianum)
Adiantum cunninghamii
Adiantum cupreum
Adiantum curvatum
Adiantum davidii
Adiantum diaphanum – filmy maidenhair, small maidenhair.
Adiantum dioganum
Adiantum diphyllum
Adiantum discretodenticulatum
Adiantum dissimulatum
Adiantum edgeworthii
Adiantum elegantulum
Adiantum erylliae
Adiantum erythrochlamys
Adiantum excisum – Chilean maidenhair
Adiantum fengianum
Adiantum fimbriatum
Adiantum flabellulatum
Adiantum formosum – giant maidenhair, Australian maidenhair
Adiantum fossarum
Adiantum fragile – fragile maidenhair
Adiantum fragrans 
Adiantum fructosum
Adiantum fulvum
Adiantum gertrudis
Adiantum gibbosum
Adiantum gingkoides
Adiantum glabrum
Adiantum glaureosum
Adiantum glaucescens
Adiantum glaucinum
Adiantum glaziovii
Adiantum gomphophyllum
Adiantum gracile
Adiantum gravesii
Adiantum grossum
Adiantum hispidulum – rough maidenhair, rosy maidenhair
Adiantum hollandiae
Adiantum hornei
Adiantum hosei
Adiantum imbricatum
Adiantum incertum
Adiantum incisum
Adiantum intermedium
Adiantum jordanii – California maidenhair
Adiantum juxtapositum
Adiantum kendalii
Adiantum kingii
Adiantum klossii
Adiantum lamrianum
Adiantum latifolium – broadleaf maidenhair
Adiantum lenvingei
†Adiantum lianxianense
Adiantum lindenii
Adiantum lonrentzii
Adiantum lucidum
Adiantum macrocladum
Adiantum macrophyllum – largeleaf maidenhair
Adiantum madagascariense
Adiantum malaliense
Adiantum malesianum
Adiantum mariesii
Adiantum mariposatum
Adiantum mcvaughii
Adiantum melanoleucum – fragrant maidenhair
Adiantum mendoncae
Adiantum menglianense
Adiantum mettenii
Adiantum mindanaense
Adiantum monochlamys
Adiantum monosorum
Adiantum multisorum
Adiantum myriosorum
Adiantum neoguineense
Adiantum novae-caledoniae
Adiantum nudum
Adiantum oaxacanum
Adiantum obliquum – oblique maidenhair
Adiantum ogasawarense
Adiantum opacum
Adiantum ornithopodum
Adiantum ovalescens
Adiantum palaoense
Adiantum papillosum
Adiantum paraense
Adiantum patens
Adiantum pearcei
Adiantum pedatum – northern maidenhair, five-fingered fern
Adiantum pentadactylon
Adiantum peruvianum – silver-dollar fern, Peruvian maidenhair
Adiantum petiolatum – stalked maidenhair
Adiantum philippense
Adiantum phyllitidis
Adiantum platyphyllum
Adiantum poiretti
Adiantum polyphyllum – giant maidenhair
Adiantum pseudotinctum
Adiantum pulchellum
Adiantum pulcherrimum
Adiantum pulverulentum – glossy maidenhair
Adiantum pumilum
Adiantum pyramidale – pyramid maidenhair
Adiantum raddianum – delta maidenhair
Adiantum rectangulare
Adiantum reniforme – lotus-leaved maidenhair fern
Adiantum rhizophorum
Adiantum robinsonii
Adiantum roborowskii
Adiantum rondoni
Adiantum rubellum
Adiantum rufopetalum
Adiantum scabrum
Adiantum schmalzii
Adiantum schmidtchenii
Adiantum schweinfurthii
Adiantum seemannii – Seeman's maidenhair
Adiantum semiorbiculatum
Adiantum senae
Adiantum serratifolium
Adiantum shastense
Adiantum siamense
Adiantum silvaticum
Adiantum sinicum
Adiantum soboliferum
Adiantum sordidum
Adiantum stenochlamys
Adiantum stolzii
Adiantum subcordatum – big maidenhair
Adiantum subpedatum 
Adiantum tenerum – fan maidenhair, brittle maidenhair
Adiantum tenuissimum
Adiantum tetragonum
Adiantum tetraphyllum – fourleaf maidenhair
Adiantum thalictroides
Adiantum trapeziforme – diamond maidenhair
Adiantum tricholepis – fuzzy maidenhair
Adiantum trilobum
Adiantum tripteris
Adiantum venustum – evergreen maidenhair, Himalayan maidenhair.
Adiantum villosissimum
Adiantum villosum – woolly maidenhair
Adiantum viridescens
Adiantum viridimontanum – Green Mountain maidenhair
Adiantum vivesii – Puerto Rico maidenhair
Adiantum vogelii
Adiantum wattii
Adiantum wilsonii – Wilson's maidenhair
Adiantum zollingeri

Gallery

References

Germplasm Resources Information Network: Adiantum
Flora of North America: Adiantum
Flora of China: Adiantum species list

External links

 
Fern genera
Taxa named by Carl Linnaeus